Paul Kennedy is a broadcast journalist who works at the Canadian Broadcasting Corporation.  He is a veteran broadcaster and award-winning documentarist, and is best known for being the host of the program Ideas on CBC Radio One from 1999 to his retirement in 2019.

In 1977, he researched and wrote his first documentary segment (on the subject of the fur trade), titled The Fur Trade Revisited. This was featured in an Ideas series entitled Red Man, White World.

While hosting Ideas, Kennedy continued to do documentary work.

Education
Born and raised in St. Catharines, Ontario, Kennedy has a Bachelor of Arts degree from Queen's University, Kingston, Ontario, and a Master of Letters degree from the University of Edinburgh, Scotland. He has also done postgraduate work at the University of Toronto, where he studied with the media theoretician Marshall McLuhan.

Awards
 ACTRA award for best Canadian radio documentary for War on the Home Front, co-authored with Timothy Findley
 B'nai B'rith Media Human Rights Award for Nuremberg on Trial
 Woods Hole Oceanographic Institution Special Citation for Excellence in Ocean Science Journalism (2005), for Learning from the Oceans

References

External links
 CBC: His last show: June 28, 2019: Learning to Listen: Paul Kennedy's takeaway lesson Paul Kennedy - Ideas

Alumni of the University of Edinburgh
Canadian radio journalists
CBC Radio hosts
Living people
Journalists from Ontario
People from St. Catharines
Queen's University at Kingston alumni
Year of birth missing (living people)